This is the discography for American jazz musician Clare Fischer.

As leader 

Jazz (1961, in Mexico City, with Víctor Ruiz Pazos, double bass; Salvador Agüero Rabito, drum; Jesús Aguirre, trombone; Chilo Morán and Nacho Rosales, trumpets; Juan Ravelo, Primitivo Ornelas and Tomás Rodríguez, saxophones)
First Time Out (Pacific Jazz, 1962)
Bossa Nova Jazz Samba (Pacific Jazz, 1962) with Bud Shank
Brasamba! (Pacific Jazz, 1963) with Bud Shank and Joe Pass
Surging Ahead (Pacific Jazz, 1963)
Extension (Pacific Jazz, 1963)
So Danço Samba (Pacific Jazz, 1964)
Manteca! (Pacific Jazz, 1965)
Easy Livin' (1966)
Songs for Rainy Day Lovers (1967) – reissued in 1978 
One to Get Ready, Four to Go (1968)
Thesaurus (1969) – reissued in 1979
Great White Hope (& His Japanese Friend) (1970)
Love is Surrender: Ralph Carmichael Presents the Multi-Keyboards of Clare Fischer (1971)
T'DA-A-A! (1972) – Clare Fischer & the Yamaha Quartet
Clare Fischer In the Reclamation Act of 1972! (1972)
Tell It Like It Is (1972)
Report of the 1st Annual Symposium on Relaxed Improvisation (1973) – with Warne Marsh and Gary Foster
Music Inspired by the Kinetic Sculpture of Don Conard Mobiles (1975)
The State of His Art (1976)
Clare Declares (1977)
America the Beautiful (1978) – previously released as Songs for Rainy Day Lovers in 1967
Jazz Song (1979)
 'Twas Only Yesterday (1979) – previously released as Thesaurus in 1968
Clare Fischer & EX-42 (1979) – originally released as T'DA-A-A! in 1972
Duality (1980)
Salsa Picante (1980)
Alone Together (1980) – Clare Fischer & the Brunner-Schwer Steinway, re-released in 1997
2+2 (1981) – winner Grammy Award for Best Latin Recording
Machaca (1981)
Head, Heart and Hands (1982)
And Sometimes Voices (1982) – with 2+2
September Afternoon (1982) – with Donald Byrd
Starbright (1983) – with Gary Foster
Whose Woods Are These?  (1984) – with Gary Foster, Grammy nomination
Extension (1984) – with Jerry Coker
Crazy Bird (1985) – Re-released in 1992	
Free Fall (1986) – winner Grammy Award for Best Jazz Vocal Performance, Duo or Group
Clare Fischer Plays (1987)
Tjaderama (1987)					 		
Blues Trilogy (1987) – with Gary Foster
Waltz (1988)	
Remembrances (Lembranças) (1990)
Memento (1992)	
Just Me: Solo Piano Excursions (1995)
Rockin' in Rhythm (1997) – Clare Fischer & Friends
The Latin Side (1997) – Clare Fischer & Metropole Orchestra
Clare Fischer's Jazz Corps (1998)
Latin Patterns (1999) – Clare Fischer & The Legendary MPS Sessions
Symbiosis (1999) – Clare Fischer & Hélio Delmiro
Bert van den Brink Invites Clare Fischer (2000)
After the Rain (2001)
On a Turquoise Cloud (2002)
Introspectivo (2005)
A Family Affair (2006)
...And Sometimes Instruments (2011) – The Clare Fischer Voices
Continuum (2011) – The Clare Fischer Big Band
¡Ritmo! (2012) – The Clare Fischer Latin Jazz Big Band, winner Grammy Award for Best Latin Jazz Album
Music for Strings, Percussion and the Rest (2013) – winner Grammy Award for Best Instrumental Composition (for "Pensiamento for Solo Alto Saxophone and Chamber Orchestra")

As arranger 

With Donald Byrd
September Afternoon (Discovery, 1982) – recorded in 1956 and 1957
With Gene Puerling
and The Hi-Lo's
Suddenly It's the Hi-Lo's (Columbia, 1957) – uncredited, also piano
Ring Around Rosie (Columbia, 1957) – uncredited, also piano
Love Nest (Columbia, 1958) – uncredited, also piano
The Hi-Lo's and All That Jazz (Columbia, 1959) – also piano
This Time It's Love (Columbia, 1962)
Now - The Hi-Lo's! (Pausa, 1981) – also electric piano
 and Singers Unlimited
A Special Blend (MPS, 1976) – also electric piano
With Dizzy Gillespie
A Portrait of Duke Ellington (Verve, 1960)
With Al Grey
The Thinking Man's Trombone (1960) – 5-part a capella arrangement for trumpet, two trombones, tenor and baritone saxophones on "Tenderly"
With Cal Tjader
West Side Story (Fantasy, 1960) – also piano
Cal Tjader Plays Harold Arlen (Fantasy, 1962)
Cal Tjader Plays the Contemporary Music of Mexico and Brazil (Verve, 1962) – also piano
With George Shearing
Shearing Bossa Nova (Fantasy, 1963)
With Stan Kenton
Stan Kenton Conducts the Los Angeles Neophonic Orchestra (Capitol, 1965)
With David Raksin
Will Penny': Music from the Motion Picture and Other Themes (Dot, 1968) – arranged "Flugelhorn Samba" 
With Willie RuffThe Smooth Side of Ruff (Columbia Records, 1968) – orchestral arrangement on "Pa Moscunia Vechera"
With Hubert LawsIn the Beginning (CTI, 1974) – also piano
With Rufus (band)
 Rufus Featuring Chaka Khan (album) (ABC Records, 1975), Ask Rufus (ABC Records, 1977), Street Player (ABC Records, 1978) all string arrangements
With The Jacksons
 Destiny (Epic, 1978) – string arrangements on "Push Me Away"
With Osamu KitajimaMasterless Samurai (1978), strings on "Breath of Night"
With Charles LloydAutumn in New York (Destiny, 1979) - also conductor
With SwitchReaching for Tomorrow (Gordy, 1980), strings on "A Brighter Tomorrow"
With Carlos Santana
 String arrangement on "Vereda Tropical" on the Havana Moon LP (1983), misspelled as Claire Fisher
With Neil DiamondHeaded for the Future (Columbia, 1985)
With The Baylor University A Cappella ChoirFairest Lord Jesus (Word, 1986) – hymn settings
With Desiree ColemanDesiree (Motown, 1988) – string arrangement on "Until Tonight"
With Robert PalmerHeavy Nova (EMI, 1988) – string arrangementsDon't Explain (EMI, 1990)Ridin' High (EMI, 1992)
With Pieces of a DreamSchool Daze (OST) (EMI, 1988)
With Paul McCartneyFlowers in the Dirt (EMI, 1989) – orchestral arrangement on "Distractions" and on "The Lovers That Never Were" (unreleased)
With Al JarreauMusic From 'Do the Right Thing (Motown, 1989) – string arrangement on "Never Explain Love"
With Paulyna Carraz
Paulyna Carraz (Melody, 1990) – string arrangements on "Delirio" and "Otra Vez" (also played piano on "Cosa Como Tu")
With The Family Stand
Moon in the Scorpio (Nocturnal Art, 1991)
With João Gilberto
João (Verve, 1991)
With Diane Schuur
In Tribute (GRP, 1992) – string arrangements and piano on "The Man I Love" and "'Round Midnight"
With Jevetta Steele
Here It Is (Sony Music Entertainment, 1993) – string arrangement on "Hold Me"
With Terry Trotter
It's About Time (MAMA, 1993) – also electric piano, liner notes
With Lalah Hathaway
A Moment (1994) – orchestrations and string arrangements on "I'm Not Over You"
With Najee
Najee Plays Songs from the Key of Life: A Tribute to Stevie Wonder (Capitol, 1995) – strings on "Village Ghetto Land"
With Dee Dee Bridgewater
 Prelude to a Kiss: The Duke Ellington Album (Philips Classics, 1996) – orchestral arrangement on "Mood Indigo" 
With Chanticleer
Lost in the Stars (Teldec, 1996) – "In the Still of the Night" (Grammy nominee for "Best instrumental arrangement accompanied by vocals")
With John Pizzarelli
Let's Share Christmas (RCA, 1996)
With Carl Saunders
Eclecticism (SNL, 2000)
With Toni Braxton
Snowflakes (Arista, 2001) – string arrangements on "Santa Please," "Pretty Please" (Interlude), and "Have Yourself a Merry Little Christmas"
More Than a Woman (Arista, 2002), orchestral arrangements
With Terri Walker
Untitled (Def Soul, Mercury, 2002) – conductor, string arrangements

As sideman 

With Bud Shank
Bossa Nova Jazz Samba (Pacific Jazz, 1962) – piano
Brasamba! (Pacific Jazz, 1963) – piano
With Cal Tjader
Cal Tjader Plays, Mary Stallings Sings (Fantasy, 1962) – piano, arrangements
Soña Libré (Verve, 1963) – organ, piano
Guarabe (Fantasy, 1977) – electric piano
Huracán (Crystal Clear, 1978) – electric piano
Here (Galaxy, 1977 [1979])
With Joe Pass
Catch Me! (Pacific Jazz, 1963) – piano and organ
With The Jazz Crusaders
Chile Con Soul (Pacific Jazz, 1965) – organ
With Lenita Bruno
Work of Love (Nucleus, 1967) – keyboards
With Bill Stewart
The Bill Stewart Show. 500 (RU 24-8 [Dec. 1967]) (AFRTS, 1967) – LP recording of one-hour radio show with guest Clare Fischer 
With Ralph Carmichael
Songs of Living Hope (Stylist, 1967) – piano and organ

With Quincy Jones
 The Hot Rock OST (Prophesy, 1972)
 Dollar$: Music from the Original Motion Picture Soundtrack (Reprise, 1972)
With Moacir Santos
Maestro (Blue Note, 1972)
Carnival of the Spirits (Blue Note, 1975)
With Lalo Schifrin
Enter the Dragon (soundtrack) (Warner Bros., 1973)
With Disneyland Records 

Island at the Top of the World (DR ST-3814, 1974) – 'Storyteller' LP adaptation of feature film features Fischer adapting Maurice Jarre's score for organ.
Escape From Witch Island (DR ST-3809, 1975) – 'Storyteller' LP adaptation of feature film features Fischer adapting Johnny Mandel's score for organ.
With Laurindo Almeida
Virtuoso Guitar (Crystal Clear, 1977) – piano, electric piano (45 RPM limited edition)
With Art Pepper
Tokyo Debut [live] (Galaxy, 1977 [1995])
With Donald Byrd
Donald Byrd and 125th Street, N.Y.C. (Elektra, 1979) - keyboards
With Bill Perkins
Many Ways to Go (Sea Breeze, 1980) – organ

With various artists
Black and White (Columbia, 1981)
With Sandi Shoemake
Slowly (Discovery, 1984)
With Lisa Rich
Touch of the Rare (Trend, 1985)
With Jon Crosse
Lullabies Go Jazz: Sweet Songs for Sweet Dreams (Jazz Cat, 1985)
Peter and the Wolf Play Jazz (Jazz Cat, 1989)
With Jeff Berlin
Pump It (Passport, 1986)
Taking Notes (Denon, 1997)
Crossroads (Denon, 1998)
In Harmony's Way (M.A.J. 2001)
With Larry Carlton
Christmas at My House (MCA, 1989) – electric piano
With Amy Grant
Home for Christmas (A&M, 1992)
With Ettore Stratta & The Royal Philharmonic Orchestra
Symphonic Boleros (Teldec, 1993) – piano on César Portillo's "Delirio" and María Grever's "Cuando Vuelva a tu Lado," both arranged by Jorge Calandrelli
With Armando Manzanero
El Piano Manzanero y sus amigos (1995) on "Como yo te amé" (arranged by Jorge Calandrelli) and "Ojalá Que Seas Tú"; acoustic piano. BMG U.S. Latin – 7 43212 61222 6, RCA – 7 43212 61222 6
With Nestor Torres 
Talk to Me (Sony Discos, 1996) – electric piano on "Sabor a Mí" and "If"

References 

Discographies of American artists
Jazz discographies